The 2015 UCF Knights baseball team represents the University of Central Florida during the 2015 NCAA Division I baseball season. The Knights play their home games at Jay Bergman Field as a member of the American Athletic Conference. They are led by head coach Terry Rooney, in his seventh season at UCF.

Previous season
In 2014, the Knights finished the season 2nd in the American with a record of 36–23, 17–7 in conference play. They qualified for the 2014 American Athletic Conference baseball tournament and were eliminated in pool play. They failed to qualify for the 2014 NCAA Division I baseball tournament.

Personnel

Roster

Coaching staff

Schedule

! style="background:#000000;color:white;" | Regular season
|-

|- align="center" bgcolor="#bbffbb"
| February 13 ||  ||  || Jay Bergman Field • Orlando, Florida, || W 4–1 || Rodgers (1–0) || Goossens (0–1) || Davis (1) || 1,543 || 1–0 || –
|- align="center" bgcolor="#bbffbb"
| February 14 || Siena ||  || Jay Bergman Field • Orlando, Florida || W 13–4 || Howell (1–0) || Morales (0–1) ||  || 1,154 || 2–0 || –
|- align="center" bgcolor="#bbffbb"
| February 15 || Siena ||  || Jay Bergman Field • Orlando, Florida || W 11–0 || Finfrock (1–0) || Ahearn (0–1) ||  || 1,135 || 3–0 || –
|- align="center" bgcolor="#bbffbb"
| February 17 || Bethune-Cookman ||  || Jay Bergman Field • Orlando, Florida || W 10–2 || Meyer (1–0) || O'Brien (0–1) ||  || 989 || 4–0 || –
|- align="center" bgcolor="#bbffbb"
| February 20 || vs. Arkansas ||  || Eddie Stanky Field • Mobile, Alabama || W 9–5 || Hukari (1–0) || Taccolini (1–1) || Davis (2) || 75 || 5–0 || –
|- align="center" bgcolor="#bbffbb"
| February 21 || vs. #27  ||  || Eddie Stanky Field • Mobile, Alabama || W 7–6 || Finfrock (2–0) || Stiles (0–1) || Marsh (1) || 79 || 6–0 || –
|- align="center" bgcolor="#bbffbb"
| February 22 || at  ||  || Eddie Stanky Field • Mobile, Alabama || W 7–5 || Howell (2–0) || McMullen (0–1) || Thompson (1) || 1,389 || 7–0 || –
|- align="center" bgcolor="#bbffbb"
| February 25 || at Bethune-Cookman || #17 || Jackie Robinson Ballpark • Dayton Beach, Florida, || W 18–8 || Hepple (1–0) || Norris (0–1) ||  || 157 || 8–0 || –
|- align="center" bgcolor="#bbffbb"
| February 27 ||  || #17 || Jay Bergman Field • Orlando, Florida || W 5–4 || Hukari (2–0) || Short (1–1) ||  || 2,037 || 9–0 || –
|-

|- align="center" bgcolor="#bbffbb"
| March 1 || Ole Miss || #17 || Jay Bergman Field • Orlando, Florida || W 3–2 (7) || Finfrock (3–0) || Bramlett (2–1) || Hukari (1) || 1,646 || 10–0 || –
|- align="center" bgcolor="ffbbbb"
| March 1 || Ole Miss || #17 || Jay Bergman Field • Orlando, Florida || L 3–4 || Short (2–1) || Thompson (0–1) ||  || 1,646 || 10–1 || –
|- align="center" bgcolor="#bbffbb"
| March 3 || #5 Florida || #10 || Jay Bergman Field • Orlando, Florida || W 4–3 || Hukari (3–0) || Poyner (0–1) || Thompson (2) || 4,319 || 11–1 || –
|- align="center" bgcolor="#ffbbbb"
| March 4 || at #5 Florida || #10 || Alfred A. McKethan Stadium • Gainesville, Florida, || L 2–10 || Snead (1–0) || Hepple (1–1) ||  || 2,705 || 11–2 || –
|- align="center" bgcolor="#bbffbb"
| March 6 ||  || #10 || Jay Bergman Field • Orlando, Florida || W 9–1 || Rodgers (2–0) || Thanopoulos (0–2) ||  || 1,001 || 12–2 || –
|- align="center" bgcolor="#bbffbb"
| March 7 || Columbia || #10 || Jay Bergman Field • Orlando, Florida || W 5–1 || Finfrock (4–0) || Roy (0–1) || Hukari (2) || 1,111 || 13–2 || –
|- align="center" bgcolor="#bbffbb"
| March 8 || Columbia || #10 || Jay Bergman Field • Orlando, Florida || W 9–3 || Howell (3–0) || Marks (0–1) ||  || 1,075 || 14–2 || –
|- align="center" bgcolor="#ffbbbb"
| March 10 || at #11 Florida State || #9 || Dick Howser Stadium • Tallahassee, Florida, || L 8–11 || Byrd (3–0) || Marsh (0–1) || Strode (7) || 3,980 || 14–3 || –
|- align="center" bgcolor="#ffbbbb"
| March 11 || at #11 Florida State || #9 || Dick Howser Stadium • Tallahassee, Florida || L 11–15 || Deise (1–0) || Thompson (0–2) ||  || 3,728 || 14–4 || –
|- align="center" bgcolor="#bbffbb"
| March 13 ||  || #9 || Jay Bergman Field • Orlando, Florida || W 11–1 || Finfrock (5–0) || Ashworth (0–1) ||  || 972 || 15–4 || –
|- align="center" bgcolor="#bbffbb"
| March 14 || Fairfield || #9 || Jay Bergman Field • Orlando, Florida || W 6–5 || Howell (4–0) || Panciera (0–1) || Hukari (3) || 1,038 || 16–4 || –
|- align="center" bgcolor="#bbffbb"
| March 15 || Fairfield || #9 || Jay Bergman Field • Orlando, Florida || W 16–10 || Hepple (2–0) || Wallace (0–2) ||  || 1,380 || 17–4 || –
|- align="center" bgcolor="#bbffbb"
| March 17 || at Bethune-Cookman || #10 || Jackie Robinson Ballpark • Daytona Beach, Florida || W 18–13 || Meyer (2–0) || Duprey (0–3) || Rodgers (1) || 103 || 18–4 || –
|- align="center" bgcolor="#bbffbb"
| March 20 ||  || #10 || Jay Bergman Field • Orlando, Florida || W 6–5 || Rodgers (3–0) || Wortkoetter (3–3) ||  || 1,162 || 19–4 || –
|- align="center" bgcolor="#ffbbbb"
| March 21 || Presbyterian || #10 || Jay Bergman Field • Orlando, Florida || L 6–8 || Sauer (3–1) || Howell (4–1) || Kehner (2) || 1,092 || 19–5 || –
|- align="center" bgcolor="#bbffbb"
| March 22 || Presbyterian || #10 || Jay Bergman Field • Orlando, Florida || W 18–4 || Hepple (3–1) || Lesiak (1–2) ||  || 1,252 || 20–5 || –
|- align="center" bgcolor="#ffbbbb"
| March 24 || at  || #8 || John Sessions Stadium • Jacksonville, Florida, || L 9–13 || Stockton (2–1) || Hukari (3–2) || || 190 || 20–6 || –
|- align="center" bgcolor="#bbffbb"
| March 27 || #15 Houston || #8 || Jay Bergman Field • Orlando, Florida || W 9–2 || Finfrock (6–0) || Lantrip (5–1) ||  || 1,397 || 21–6 || 1–0
|- align="center" bgcolor="#ffbbbb"
| March 28 || #15 Houston || #6 || Jay Bergman Field • Orlando, Florida || L 5–7 || Dowdy (3–0) || Howell (4–2) ||  Romero (4) || 1,555 || 21–7 || 1–1
|- align="center" bgcolor="#bbffbb"
| March 29 || #15 Houston || #6 || Jay Bergman Field • Orlando, Florida || W 4–3 || Rodgers (4–0) || Romero (3–2) ||  || 1,281 || 22–7 || 2–1
|- align="center" bgcolor="#ffbbbb"
| March 31 || #22  || #6 || Jay Bergman Field • Orlando, Florida || L 5–11 || Labsan (2–0) || Thompson (0–3) ||  || 1,685 || 22–8 || 2–1
|-

|- align="center" bgcolor="#ffbbbb"
| April 2 || at Cincinnati || – || Marge Schott Stadium • Cincinnati, Ohio, || L 1–4 || Atkinson (2–3) || Finfrock (6–1) || Zellner (1) || 267 || 22–9 || 2–2
|- align="center" bgcolor="#ffbbbb"
| April 3 || at Cincinnati || #6 || Marge Schott Stadium • Cincinnati, Ohio || L 3–5 || Orndorff (1–1) || Howell (4–3) || Zellner (2) || 233 || 22–10 || 2–3
|- align="center" bgcolor="#bbffbb"
| April 4 || at Cincinnati || #6 || Marge Schott Stadium • Cincinnati, Ohio || W 2–1 || Rodgers (5–0) ||  Lehnen (1–5) || Zellner (2) || 917 || 23–11 || 3–3
|- align="center" bgcolor="#bbffbb"
| April 7 || Jacksonville || #12 || Jay Bergman Field • Orlando, Florida || W 6–5 || Hukari (4–1) || Babb (0–1) ||  || 1,386 ||  24–11 || 3–3
|- align="center" bgcolor="#ffbbbb"
| April 10 || Connecticut || #12 || Jay Bergman Field • Orlando, Florida || L 4–6 || Cross (7–1) || Finfrock (6–2) || Ruotolo (4) || 1,271 || 24–12 || 3–4
|- align="center" bgcolor="#ffbbbb"
| April 11 || Connecticut || #12 || Jay Bergman Field • Orlando, Florida || L 1–15 || Kay (5–3) || Howell (4–4) ||  || 1,061 || 24–13 || 3–5
|- align="center" bgcolor="#bbffbb"
| April 12 || Connecticut || #12 || Jay Bergman Field • Orlando, Florida || W 5–1 || Rodgers (6–0) || Tabakman (2–3) ||  || 898 || 25–13 || 4–5
|- align="center" bgcolor="#ffbbbb"
| April 15 || at #6 Miami (Florida) || #15 || Alex Rodriguez Park • Coral Gables, Florida, || L 2–4 || Mediavilla (2–1) || Hukari(4–2) || Garcia (8) || 2,184 || 25–14 || 4–5
|- align="center" bgcolor="#ffbbbb"
| April 17 || at Tulane || #15 || Greer Field • New Orleans, Louisiana, || L 0–3 || Merrill (2–3) || Finfrock (6–3) || Gibaut (2) || 1,106 || 25–15 || 4–6
|- align="center" bgcolor="#bbffbb"
| April 18 || at Tulane || #15 || Greer Field • New Orleans, Louisiana || W 8–0 || Rodgers (7–0) || Gibbs (3–2) ||  || 1,824 || 26–16 || 5–6
|- align="center" bgcolor="#ffbbbb"
| April 19 || at Tulane || #15 || Greer Field • New Orleans, Louisiana || L 0–10 (7) || Massey (4–2) || Hepple (3–2) || Gibaut (3) || 1,290 || 26–16 || 5–7
|- align="center" bgcolor="#ffbbbb"
| April 21 ||  || #24 || Jay Bergman Field • Orlando, Florida || L 3–9 || Vansickle (1–1) || Howell (4–5) ||  || 1,155 || 26–17 || 5–7
|- align="center" bgcolor="#ffbbbb"
| April 24 || at East Carolina || #24 || Clark–LeClair Stadium • Greenville, North Carolina, || L 5–6 || Durazo (3–0) || Hukari (4–3) ||  || 2,446 || 26–18 || 5–8
|- align="center" bgcolor="#ffbbbb"
| April 25 || at East Carolina || #24 || Clark–LeClair Stadium • Greenville, North Carolina || L 2–3 || Reid (4–3) || Finfrock (6–4) || Ingle (1) || 2,441 || 26–19 || 5–9
|- align="center" bgcolor="#ffbbbb"
| April 26 || at East Carolina || #24 || Clark–LeClair Stadium • Greenville, North Carolina || L 5–6 || Wolfe (3–1) || Howell'' (4–6) || Voliva (1) || 2,069 ||  26–20 || 5–10
|-

|- align="center" bgcolor="#bbffbb"
| May 1 || South Florida || – || Jay Bergman Field • Orlando, Florida || W 3–0 ||  ||  ||  ||  || 27–19  || 6–10
|- align="center" bgcolor="#bbffbb"
| May 2 || South Florida || – || Jay Bergman Field • Orlando, Florida || W 2–1 || Rodgers (8–0) || Herget (7–2) || Hukari (3) || 1,557 || 28–19 || 7–10
|- align="center" bgcolor="#ffbbbb"
| May 3 || South Florida || – || Jay Bergman Field • Orlando, Florida || L 3–9 || Finfrock (7–4) || Farley (3–2) ||  || 1,213 || 28–20 || 7–11
|- align="center" bgcolor="#ffbbbb"
| May 6 || at #12 Florida Atlantic || – || FAU Baseball Stadium • Boca Raton, Florida || L 2–10 || McKay (3–0) || Meyer (2–1) ||  || 474 || 28–21 || 7–11
|- align="center" bgcolor="#bbffbb"
| May 8 || Memphis || – || Jay Bergman Field • Orlando, Florida || W 10–2 || Rodgers (9–0) || Gunn (5–1) ||  || 987 || 29–21 || 8–11
|- align="center" bgcolor="#ffbbbb"
| May 9 || Memphis || – || Jay Bergman Field • Orlando, Florida || L 5–6 || Toscano (8–1) || Finfrock (7–5) || Blackwood (13) || 1,041 || 29–22 || 8–12
|- align="center" bgcolor="#bbffbb"
| May 10 || Memphis || – || Jay Bergman Field • Orlando, Florida ||  W 4–1 || Howell (5–7) || Alexander (4–1) || Hukari (5) || 885 || 30–22 || 9–12
|- align="center" bgcolor="#ffbbbb"
| May 12 || at North Florida || – || Harmon Stadium • Jacksonville, Florida || L 5–10 || Smith (5–1) || Davis (0–1) ||  || 449 || 30–23 || 9–12
|- align="center" bgcolor="#bbffbb"
| May 14 || at South Florida || – || USF Baseball Stadium • Tampa, Florida, || W 12–9 || Rodgers (10–0) || Herget (8–3) ||  || 706 || 31–23 || 10–12
|- align="center" bgcolor="#ffbbbb"
| May 15 || at South Florida || – || USF Baseball Stadium • Tampa, Florida || L 3–7 || Farley (4–2) || Hukari (4–4) ||  || 508 || 31–24 || 10–13
|- align="center" bgcolor="#ffbbbb"
| May 16 || at South Florida || – || USF Baseball Stadium • Tampa, Florida || L 4–5 || Mulholland (5–7) || Howell (5–8) || Peterson (15) || 1,311 || 31–25 || 10–14
|-

|-
! style="background:#000000;color:white;" | Post-season
|-

|- align="center" bgcolor="#ffbbbb"
| May 20 || #2 East Carolina  || – || Bright House Field • Clearwater, Florida, || L 3–4 || Ingle (1–0) || Rodgers (10–1) ||  ||  || 31–26  || 0–1
|- align="center" bgcolor="#ffbbbb"
| May 21 || #6 Connecticut || – || Bright House Field • Clearwater, Florida|| L 3–4 (11) || Kay (8–6) || Howell''' (5–9) ||  ||  || 31–27 || 0–2
|-

All rankings from Collegiate Baseball.

Rankings

Awards and honors
Zach Rodgers
 Pre-season All-AAC

Dylan Moore
 Pre-season All-AAC

Matt Diorio
 Pre-season All-AAC

References

UCF Knights
UCF Knights baseball seasons
UCF Knights baseball